A rug plot is a plot of data for a single quantitative variable, displayed as marks along an axis. It is used to visualise the distribution of the data. As such it is analogous to a histogram with zero-width bins, or a one-dimensional scatter plot.

Rug plots are often used in combination with two-dimensional scatter plots by placing a rug plot of the x values of the data along the x-axis, and similarly for the y values. This is the origin of the term "rug plot", as these rug plots with perpendicular markers look like tassels along the edges of the rectangular "rug" of the scatter plot.

External links 
Rug plots in R
Rug plots in Matlab

Statistical charts and diagrams